Oeniadae or Oiniadai was a village of ancient Thessaly in the district of Oetaea.

Its site is unlocated.

References

Populated places in ancient Thessaly
Former populated places in Greece
Oetaea
Lost ancient cities and towns